This is a list of international rankings.

By category

Agriculture
List of largest producing countries of agricultural commodities
List of countries by apple production
List of countries by apricot production
List of countries by artichoke production
List of countries by barley production
List of countries by cereal production
List of countries by coconut production
List of countries by coffee production
List of countries by cherry production
List of countries by cucumber production
List of countries by eggplant production
List of countries by forest area
List of countries by garlic production
List of countries by irrigated land area
List of countries by papaya production
List of countries by pineapple production
List of countries by plum production
List of countries by potato production
List of countries by soybean production
List of countries by tomato production

Consumption
 List of countries by meat consumption
 List of countries by beer consumption per capita
 List of countries by milk consumption per capita
 List of countries by natural gas consumption
 List of countries by electricity consumption
 List of countries by oil consumption
 Annual cannabis use by country
 List of countries by prevalence of opiates use
 List of countries by prevalence of cocaine use

Culture
List of countries by number of Academy Awards for Best International Feature Film
List of World Heritage Sites by country
Books published per country per year

Economy
World Economic Forum: Global Competitiveness Report 
World Economic Forum: Financial Development Index
International Institute for Management Development: World Competitiveness Yearbook
Gini index: List of countries by income equality
Bloomberg Innovation Index
Global Innovation Index
International Innovation Index
Index of Economic Freedom
Ease of doing business index
Indigo Index
Transparency International: Corruption Perceptions Index

Lists
List of countries by economic complexity
List of countries by external debt
List of countries by long-term unemployment rate
List of countries by net international investment position per capita
List of countries by average wage
List of minimum wages by country
List of countries by public debt
List of countries by wealth per adult
List of countries by credit rating
List of countries by government budget
Gross national income
List of countries by GNI (PPP) per capita
List of countries by GNI (nominal, Atlas method) per capita
Lists of countries by GDP
List of countries by GDP sector composition
List of countries by GDP (nominal)
List of countries by GDP (nominal) per capita
List of countries by GDP (PPP) per capita
List of countries by GDP (PPP)
List of countries by real GDP growth rate
List of countries by tax revenue to GDP ratio
List of countries by largest historical GDP

Education and innovation
List of countries by spending on education (% of GDP)
List of countries by 25- to 34-year-olds having a tertiary education degree
Education Index
Trends in International Mathematics and Science Study
Programme for International Student Assessment
Progress in International Reading Literacy Study
List of countries by literacy rate
World Intellectual Property Indicators
List of countries by tertiary education attainment
List of countries by secondary education attainment
EF English Proficiency Index
Programming Ability Index
Organisation for Economic Co-operation and Development: The OECD Programme for International Student Assessment (PISA)
International Association for the Evaluation of Educational Achievement: Trends in International Mathematics and Science Study
Educational Testing Service: 2003-2004 TOEFL Test Year Data Summary
Webometrics Ranking of World Universities
List of Nobel laureates by country

Environment
List of countries by air pollution
List of countries by natural disaster risk
Climate Change Performance Index (CCPI)
Environmental Performance Index (EPI)
Environmental Sustainability Index (ESI)
Environmental Vulnerability Index (EVI)
Happy Planet Index (HPI)
List of countries by ecological footprint
Sustainable Society Index (SSI)
The Global 100 (G100)
List of countries by freshwater withdrawal
List of countries by carbon dioxide emissions per capita
List of countries by carbon dioxide emissions

Exports
 List of countries by net exports
 List of countries by exports per capita
 List of countries by aluminium exports
 List of countries by natural gas exports
 List of countries by net oil exports
 List of countries by oil exports
 List of countries by refined petroleum exports
 List of countries by gold exports
 List of countries by copper exports
 List of countries by iron-ore exports
 List of countries by diamond exports
 List of countries by electricity exports
 List of countries by car exports
 List of countries by truck exports
 List of countries by ship exports
 List of countries by automotive component exports
 List of countries by aircraft component exports
 List of countries by aircraft and spacecraft exports
 List of countries by engine exports
 List of countries by gas turbine exports
 List of countries by computer exports
 List of countries by integrated circuit exports
 List of countries by telephone exports
 List of countries by telecommunications equipment exports
 List of countries by pharmaceutical exports
 List of countries by maize exports
 List of countries by wheat exports
 List of countries by coffee exports
 List of countries by cotton exports

General
Good Country Index
Linguistic diversity index
Soft Power 30 (on Wikipedia)
Country Brand Index

Geography
List of political and geographic subdivisions by total area (all)
List of countries and dependencies by area

Health
List of countries by health insurance coverage
List of countries by quality of healthcare
List of countries by health expenditure covered by government
List of countries by hospital beds
List of countries by cancer rate
List of countries by risk of death from non-communicable disease
Euro health consumer index (EHCI)
Global Hunger Index (GHI)
List of countries by life expectancy
List of countries by infant mortality rate
List of average human height worldwide
List of countries by body mass index
List of countries by obesity rate
List of countries by HIV/AIDS adult prevalence rate
Prevalence of tobacco consumption
List of countries by cigarette consumption per capita
List of countries by alcohol consumption per capita
List of countries by suicide rate
List of the oldest people by country

Industry
 List of countries by electricity production
 List of countries by electricity production from renewable sources
 List of countries by uranium production
 List of countries by platinum production
 List of countries by gold production
 List of countries by silver production
 List of countries by copper production
 List of countries by steel production
 List of countries by aluminium production
 List of countries by aluminium oxide production
 List of countries by bismuth production
 List of countries by mercury production
 List of countries by bentonite production
 List of countries by feldspar production
 List of countries by lithium production
 List of countries by palladium production
 List of countries by iridium production
 List of countries by manganese production
 List of countries by magnesium production
 List of countries by tin production
 List of countries by zinc production
 List of countries by salt production
 List of countries by silicon production
 Lists of countries by mineral production
 List of countries by oil production
 List of countries by natural gas production
 List of countries by coal production
 List of countries by bauxite production
 List of countries by cement production
 List of wine-producing countries

Military
List of aircraft carriers by country
List of countries by firearms holding
List of countries by military expenditures
List of countries by military expenditures per capita
List of countries by Military Strength Index
List of countries by number of military and paramilitary personnel
Composite Index of National Capability

Politics
UN e-Government
Transparency International: Global Corruption Barometer and Corruption Perceptions Index
Economist Intelligence Unit: Democracy Index
Freedom House: Freedom in the World
Reporters Without Borders: Worldwide Press Freedom Index
List of countries by consultation on rule-making
Global Terrorism Index
Worldwide Governance Indicators
Fragile States Index
World Justice Project Rule of Law Index
V-Dem Institute: Democracy Indices
presidentialism index
Citizen-initiated component of direct popular vote index
Democracy Index
Polity data series
Democracy-Dictatorship Index
Gallagher index
Effective number of parties
Democracy Ranking

Reserves
 List of countries by coal reserves
 List of countries by natural gas proven reserves
 List of countries by proven oil reserves
 List of countries by thorium resources
 List of countries by uranium reserves
 List of countries by foreign-exchange reserves
 List of countries by foreign-exchange reserves (excluding gold)

Society
Dashboard of Sustainability (includes a ranking by Millennium Development Goals)
Economist Intelligence Unit: Where-to-be-born Index 2013
Globalization Index
Global Gender Gap Report
Global Retirement Index
Legatum Prosperity Index
List of countries and dependencies by population
List of countries and dependencies by population density
List of countries by discrimination and violence against minorities
List of countries by guaranteed minimum income
List of countries by gun ownership
List of countries by homeless population
List of countries by incarceration rate
List of countries by intentional homicide rate
List of countries by public spending in tertiary education
List of countries ranked by ethnic and cultural diversity level
Save the Children: State of the World's Mothers report
Social Progress Index
Urbanization by country
United Nations Development Programme: Human Development Index
Walk Free Foundation: Global Slavery Index
World Giving Index
World Happiness Report

Sport
 Archery
 Athletics
 Badminton (junior)
 Beach soccer
 Baseball & softball
 Basketball (men, women)
 Boxing
 Chess
 Cricket (Test, ODI, T20I)
 Curling
 Cycling (road)
 Darts (PDC)
 Figure skating
 Floorball
 Football (men, Elo men, women)
 Golf (men, women, amateur)
 Field hockey
 Ice hockey
 Korfball
 Muay Thai
 Netball
 Olympic Medals 
 Paralympic Medals
 Roller hockey
 Rugby league (men, women, wheelchair)
 Rugby union
 Snooker
 Squash (men, women)
 Table tennis
 Tennis (men, women, team)
 Volleyball (beach)
 Water Polo

Technology
UN International Telecommunication Union: ICT Development Index
Economist Intelligence Unit: Government Broadband Index
List of countries by Internet connection speeds
List of countries by 4G LTE penetration
List of countries by mobile banking usage
Google: List of countries by smartphone penetration
List of countries by stem cell research trials
OECD: List of countries by number of broadband Internet subscriptions
List of countries by number of Internet hosts
Space Competitiveness Index (SCI)
World Wide Web Foundation: Web Index

Transport
 Logistics Performance Index
 List of countries by rail usage
 List of countries by rail transport network size
 List of countries by traffic-related death rate
 List of countries by vehicles per capita
 List of countries by waterways length

See also
 Index number
 List of globalization-related indices
 List of freedom indices
 List of democracy indices

External links
CSGR Global Benchmarking Database